Jairo Álvarez Gutiérrez (born 21 March 1986 in Avilés, Asturias), sometimes known simply as Jairo, is a Spanish former footballer who played as a midfielder.

External links

1986 births
Living people
People from Avilés
Spanish footballers
Footballers from Asturias
Association football midfielders
Segunda División players
Segunda División B players
Tercera División players
Real Oviedo Vetusta players
Real Oviedo players
Sporting de Gijón B players
Sporting de Gijón players
Deportivo Fabril players
Deportivo Alavés players
Lorca Deportiva CF footballers
CF Palencia footballers
Zamora CF footballers
UD Melilla footballers
CD Guadalajara (Spain) footballers
CP Cacereño players
UCAM Murcia CF players
Real Avilés CF footballers
Spain youth international footballers